The Perfect Human is a cult short film in black and white by Jørgen Leth lasting 13 minutes about a middle class Danish couple performing everyday rituals.
The film examines human behavior in a suave, pseudo-scientific way. It depicts well-dressed actors, a man and a woman, both labelled 'the perfect human' in a detached manner, 'functioning' in a blank boundless room, as though they were subjects in a zoo. The tone of world-weary detachment is created through a voice-over providing comments on their mundane actions.

The film was later seen in five different versions when Leth was challenged by filmmaker Lars von Trier, which were compiled in The Five Obstructions.

See also
 The Perfect Human (alevism)

References

External links 
 
 
 The Perfect Human at Danish Film Institute

1960s short documentary films
1968 films
Danish short documentary films
Films directed by Jørgen Leth
Danish-language films
1968 short films
1968 documentary films